South Korea competed at the 2022 Winter Paralympics in Beijing, China which took place between 4–13 March 2022.

Competitors
The following is the list of number of competitors participating at the Games per sport/discipline.

Alpine skiing

South Korea competed in alpine skiing.

Men

Women

Biathlon

South Korea competed in biathlon.

Cross-country skiing

South Korea competed in cross-country skiing.

Para ice hockey

South Korea competed in para ice hockey.

Summary

Preliminary round

Quarterfinals

Semifinal

Bronze match

Snowboarding

South Korea competed in snowboarding.

Wheelchair curling

South Korea competed in wheelchair curling.

Summary

Round robin

Draw 2
Saturday, March 5, 19:35

Draw 4
Sunday, March 6, 14:35

Draw 5
Sunday, March 6, 19:35

Draw 7
Monday, March 7, 14:35

Draw 9
Tuesday, March 8, 9:35

Draw 10
Tuesday, March 8, 14:35

Draw 12
Wednesday, March 9, 9:35

Draw 14
Wednesday, March 9, 19:35

Draw 16
Thursday, March 10, 14:35

Draw 17
Thursday, March 10, 19:35

See also
South Korea at the Paralympics
South Korea at the 2022 Winter Olympics

Notes

References

Nations at the 2022 Winter Paralympics
2022
Winter Paralympics